The Little Big Econ State Forest is a state forest in the U.S. state of Florida. The Kilbee Tract is a smaller non-contiguous section of the park located east of the main forest, along Saint Johns River, the longest river in the state.

The forest's most notable feature is the Econlockhatchee River, an Outstanding Florida Water, that winds east-to-west inside the forest.  The protected area of Florida is open for picnicking, bird watching, fishing, hunting, hiking, horseback and mountain bike riding.

Etymology
The name Little Big Econ State Forest comes from combining the names of the Little Econlockhatchee River and the larger Econlockhatchee River, which flow through the forest property.

Hiking 
The old Flagler Railroad System used to traverse the central part of the state forest. The trail was originally part of the Florida East Coast Railway's Kissimmee Valley Line, also known as the Okeechobee Branch.  What was the old railway is now called the Flagler Trail. Remains of old trestle pilings can still be seen on the river. The Florida National Scenic Trail passes through the state forest and follows the southern portion of the Flagler Trail.

Mountain biking
Known as Snow Hill among local mountain bikers for the road where the trailhead is on, the forest includes a  single-track bike trail.

Camping
There are no developed campsites or hookups available in the park, only primitive camping. For canoeist, primitive camping is available with special permit.

References

Florida state forests
Protected areas of Seminole County, Florida
Protected areas established in 1990
1990 establishments in Florida